Bullitt East High School is a high school located at 11450 Highway 44 East in the city of Mount Washington, Kentucky, United States. It is part of the Bullitt County Public Schools district. Sports teams include: archery, swimming, football, soccer, tennis, track and field, baseball, softball, wrestling, basketball, volleyball, and cheerleading. Bullitt East High School offers a variety of AP classes and is partnered with KCTCS to offer rigorous dual credit courses.

Notable alumni
 Amanda Matthews, sculptor and painter
 Derek Willis, Professional Basketball Player

References

External links

Schools in Bullitt County, Kentucky
Public high schools in Kentucky
Educational institutions established in 1980
1980 establishments in Kentucky